Yōjirō, Yojiro or Youjirou is a masculine Japanese given name.

Possible writings
Yōjirō can be written using different combinations of kanji characters. Some examples:

The characters used for "jiro" (二郎 or 次郎) literally means "second son" and usually used as a suffix to a masculine name, especially for the second child. The "yo" part of the name can use a variety of characters, each of which will change the meaning of the name ("洋" for ocean, "陽" for sunshine, "楊" and so on).

洋二郎, "ocean, second son"
洋次郎, "ocean, second son"
陽二郎, "sunshine, second son"
陽次郎, "sunshine, second son"
楊二郎, "willow, second son"
楊次郎, "willow, second son"
庸二郎, "common, second son"
庸次郎, "common, second son"

Other combinations...

洋治郎, "ocean, to manage/cure, son"
洋次朗, "ocean, next, clear"
陽治郎, "sunshine, to manage/cure, son"
陽次朗, "sunshine, next, clear"
曜次朗, "weekday, next, clear"

The name can also be written in hiragana ようじろう or katakana ヨウジロウ.

Notable people with the name
Yojiro Ishizaka (石坂 洋次郎, 1900–1986), influential and popular novelist of post-World War II Japan
, Japanese botanist
, Japanese singer, songwriter, record producer and actor
Yojiro Takahagi (髙萩 洋次郎, born 1986), Japanese football player currently playing for Sanfrecce Hiroshima
Yojiro Takita (滝田 洋二郎, born 1955), Academy Award-winning Japanese filmmaker
Yojiro Terada (寺田 陽次郎, born 1947), Japanese racing driver from Kobe, Hyogo Prefecture
Yojiro Uetake (上武 洋次郎, born 1943), Japanese wrestler and Olympic champion in Freestyle wrestling

Japanese masculine given names